Jörn König (born 22 October 1967) is a German politician. Born in Berlin, he represents Alternative for Germany (AfD). Jörn König has served as a member of the Bundestag from the state of Lower Saxony since 2017.

Life 
He became member of the bundestag after the 2017 German federal election. He is a member of the sports committee.

References

External links 

 Bundestag biography 

1967 births
Living people
Members of the Bundestag for Lower Saxony
Members of the Bundestag 2021–2025
Members of the Bundestag 2017–2021
Members of the Bundestag for the Alternative for Germany